Altkirchen is a village and a former municipality in the district Altenburger Land, in Thuringia, Germany. Since 1 January 2019, it is part of the town Schmölln.

Geography

Neighboring municipalities
Communities near Altkirchen are the city of Altenburg, Dobitschen, Drogen, Göhren, Göllnitz, Saara, and the city of Schmölln.

Municipal organization
The municipality of Altkirchen was divided into 13 districts:  
Altkirchen
Gimmel
Gödissa
Göldschen
Großtauschwitz
Illsitz
Jauern
Kleintauschwitz
Kratschütz
Nöbden
Platschütz
Röthenitz 
Trebula

History
Within the German Empire (1871–1918), Altkirchen was part of the Duchy of Saxe-Altenburg. From 1952 to 1990, it was part of the Bezirk Leipzig of East Germany.

References

Altenburger Land
Duchy of Saxe-Altenburg
Former municipalities in Thuringia